is a railway station located in the town of Kasamatsu, Hashima District, Gifu Prefecture,  Japan, operated by the private railway operator Meitetsu.

Lines

Station layout
Nishi Kasamatsu Station has two ground-level side platforms connected by a level crossing. The station is unattended.

Platforms

Adjacent stations

History
It was named Kasamatsu Station in September of the same year, and became Nishi-Kasamatsu Station in May 1936.

Surrounding area
Kasamatsu Town Hall
Kasamatsu Elementary School

See also
 List of Railway Stations in Japan

References

External links

  

Railway stations in Japan opened in 1921
Stations of Nagoya Railroad
Railway stations in Gifu Prefecture
Kasamatsu, Gifu